Alexander Falconer may refer to:

Alex Falconer, Scottish politician
Sir Alexander Falconer, 1st Lord Falconer of Halkerton (1595–1671), Lord Falconer of Halkerton
Alexander Falconer, 2nd Lord Falconer of Halkerton (1620–1684), Lord Falconer of Halkerton
Alexander Falconer, 4th Lord Falconer of Halkerton (died 1727), Lord Falconer of Halkerton
Alexander Falconer, 6th Lord Falconer of Halkerton (1707–1762), Lord Falconer of Halkerton